Lost Girl is a Canadian supernatural drama television series  that premiered on Showcase on September 12, 2010. The series was created by Michelle Lovretta and is produced by Jay Firestone and Prodigy Pictures Inc., with the participation of the Canadian Television Fund (Canada Media Fund), and in association with Shaw Media. It follows the life of a bisexual succubus named Bo, played by Anna Silk, as she learns to control her superhuman abilities, help those in need, and discover the truth about her origins.

On February 27, 2014, Showcase and Shaw Media announced the renewal for a fifth and final season, with production starting in spring and the season set to air Fall 2014. On August 25, 2014, Showcase announced that season 5 would be the last, with the original 13-episode order increased to 16 final episodes and the season divided into Part 1 and Part 2.

In the United States, on March 3, 2015, Syfy announced the premiere of season 5 on April 17, 2015, at 10 p.m., with the show's broadcast day changed to Friday. The time slot was afterwards changed to Thursday at 10 p.m. effective May 21, with episode "Clear Eyes, Fae Hearts".

Cast and characters

Main cast
 Anna Silk  as Bo
 Kris Holden-Ried  as Dyson
 Zoie Palmer  as Dr. Lauren Lewis
 Rick Howland  as Fitzpatrick "Trick" McCorrigan
 Ksenia Solo  as Kenzi

Recurring cast
 Emmanuelle Vaugier as Evony Fleurette Marquise: The Morrigan
 Paul Amos as Vex: a Mesmer
 Rachel Skarsten as Tamsin: a Valkyrie
 Inga Cadranel as Aife: a Succubus and Bo's birth mother
 Vanessa Matsui as Cassie: an Oracle
 Amanda Walsh as Zee: an Ancient (a.k.a. Zeus)
 Luke Bilyk as Mark: a Shapeshifter and son of Dyson
 Noam Jenkins as Heratio: an Ancient (a.k.a. Hera)
 Shanice Banton as Iris: an Ancient (a.k.a. Nyx)
 Lisa Marcos as Alicia Welles: a human
 Eric Roberts as Hades: an Ancient and King of the Underworld, Tartarus, and Bo's father (a.k.a. Jack)
 Hannah Anderson as Persephone: an Ancient, daughter of Zee, wife of Hades, and Bo's stepmother
 Michelle Nolden as Freyja: Mistress of the Valkyries
 Kate Corbett as Stacey: a Valkyrie

Production
On April 9, 2014, Prodigy Pictures and Showcase announced the start of production on 13 episodes, with filming taking place in and around Toronto, and season 5 premiering in Fall 2014.

Michael Grassi, who became a writer and consulting producer for the series in its fourth season, moved into the position of showrunner and executive producer for season 5. Vanessa Piazza, who joined Prodigy Pictures Inc. in 2009 as a producer, was elevated to the position of executive producer on the show.

On August 25, 2014, Showcase and Anna Silk announced that season 5 would be the series' last. The original 13-episode season was extended to 16 episodes and divided into two parts consisting of eight episodes each. The fifth season premiered on December 7, 2014, with its second half scheduled for Fall 2015. On June 1, 2015, Showcase announced the final eight episodes would air beginning September 6.

After Part 1 mid-season finale episode "End of Faes" aired on June 4 in the United States, Syfy announced in a preview of Part 2 that Lost Girl would return in 2016.

Broadcast
Showcase released the first episode of Part 2, "44 Minutes to Save the World", online on August 21, 2015, in advance of the broadcast premiere on September 6, 2015. It was made available for viewing on its website and on multi digital platforms.

Episodes

Note: Showcase released season 5 as one season with 16 episodes broadcast as Part 1 and Part 2, each consisting of 8 episodes. However, some cable distributors of the  syndication count each part as a separate season, and beginning with "44 Minutes to Save the World" (ep 5.09) the second half was designated as "season 6".

References

External links
 
 Lost Girl at  Syfy (U.S.) 
  Lost Girl at Prodigy Pictures Inc.  
 Lost Girl at Canadian Television Fund  
 
 
 Lost Girl list of episodes at Garn's Guides
 Lost Girl at BO SERIES INC. (Giant Ape Media)

Season
2014 Canadian television seasons
2015 Canadian television seasons